"Grillz" is a song by American rapper Nelly featuring fellow American rappers Paul Wall, Ali & Gipp, and uncredited vocals from American singer Brandi Williams (of the group Blaque). The song was written by Nelly, Jermaine Dupri, Paul Wall, Ali, Gipp and James Phillips; it contains samples of Destiny's Child's "Soldier", written by Beyoncé Knowles, Kelendria Rowland, Tenitra Williams, Garrett Hamler, and Rich Harrison; it also contains samples of "Left Me Lonely" by MC Shan. Production was handled by Dupri. Following its release, it topped the US Billboard Hot 100 and reached the top 20 in Australia, Ireland, and New Zealand.

Awards
In 2007, the song was nominated for Best Rap Performance as a Duo or Group at the 49th Annual Grammy Awards, losing to Chamillionaire's "Ridin'".

Chart performance
"Grillz" reached number one on the US Billboard Hot 100. It stayed on the top spot for two consecutive weeks. At the end of the year it was ranked number 12 on the Billboard 2006 year-end chart. The Recording Industry Association of America (RIAA) certified "Grillz" platinum for 1,000,000 digital sales and for 1,000,000 mastertone sales.

Music video
The song's music video, directed by Fat Cats, was released in 2005. Jermaine Dupri, Big Boi, Iamsu!, Avery Storm, St. Lunatics, Taylor Made, Jung Tru, Chocolate Tai, and Johnny Dang make cameo appearances throughout the video.

Track listings
US 12-inch single
 "Grillz" (dirty version) – 4:30
 "Grillz" (clean version) – 4:30
 "Grillz" (instrumental) – 4:30

UK, European, and Australasian CD single
 "Grillz" (radio edit) – 3:47
 "Grillz" (explicit) – 4:30
 "Tired" (album version explicit featuring Avery Storm) – 3:17
 "Grillz" (video)

UK 12-inch single
A1. "Grillz" (radio edit) – 3:47
A2. "Grillz" (explicit) – 4:30
B1. "Grillz" (instrumental) – 4:30
B2. "Tired" (album version explicit featuring Avery Storm) – 3:17

Charts

Weekly charts

Year-end charts

Certifications

Release history

See also
 List of Hot 100 number-one singles of 2006 (U.S.)

References

2005 singles
2006 singles
Nelly songs
Paul Wall songs
Billboard Hot 100 number-one singles
Song recordings produced by Jermaine Dupri
Songs written by Jermaine Dupri
Songs written by Beyoncé
Songs written by Sean Garrett
Songs written by LRoc
Songs written by Rich Harrison
Songs written by T.I.
Songs written by Kelly Rowland
Songs written by Nelly
Universal Records singles
Songs written by Paul Wall
Songs written by Michelle Williams (singer)
2005 songs